Valentina Fluchaire (born 1 July, 1994) is a Mexicans transgender model and beauty queen. In March 2020, she won the "Miss International Queen" transgender beauty pageant held in Pattaya, Thailand.

Biography 
Valentina Fluchaire was born on July 1, 1994 in the city of Manzanillo, Colima, México. She is the second Mexican to win the transsexual beauty pageant Miss International Queen.

In April 5, 2019, she won the Miss Trans  México.

the 15th Miss International Queen pageant, was held on 7 March 2020, at Pattaya, Chonburi in Thailand.Jazell Barbie Royale of the United States crowned her successor, Valentina Fluchaire of Mexico at the end of the event.

References 

The information in this article is based on that in its Spanish equivalent.

1994 births
Living people
Transgender women
Mexican models
Transgender female models
Mexican female models
Beauty pageant contestants

es:Valentina Fluchaire